Brown and Carney was a comedy duo consisting of Wally Brown and Alan Carney active from 1943 to 1946.

Notes
Both actors were under contract with RKO Radio Pictures.  The two actors appeared in three films in 1943 when RKO decided to team them together as their answer to Abbott and Costello.  Brown and Carney's first film as a team was Adventures of a Rookie, which has some similarities to Abbott and Costello's 1941 film Buck Privates.  RKO Pictures sent Brown and Carney on a vaudeville tour together in 1944.  Brown's screen character is usually "Jerry Miles" and Carney's is usually "Mike Strager." The only exceptions are Seven Days Ashore, Step Lively, and Vacation in Reno.  Actress Anne Jeffreys appeared in four of Brown and Carney's films.  

Most of their films had connections to other films.  Brown and Carney's third film Step Lively was based on the same play that inspired the Marx Brothers film Room Service.  Zombies on Broadway is a semi-sequel to the Val Lewton film I Walked with a Zombie, in which Sir Lancelot reprises his role as a singer.  Their film Radio Stars on Parade is notable for having appearances by several popular radio personalities of the time:  Don Wilson, Ralph Edwards and Skinnay Ennis.  

In 1945, writer Monte Brice went through older RKO scripts to find a new idea for Brown and Carney's next - and last - movie and decided on a remake of Wheeler and Woolsey's 1935 film The Nitwits, which became Genius at Work.  Genius at Work also starred Bela Lugosi, as well as Lionel Atwill in his last feature film appearance.  This film would become Brown and Carney's eighth and final film together as a team as the studio dropped the two comedians' contracts in 1946.   

On occasion Brown and Carney appeared in the same film but not together (Mexican Spitfire's Blessed Event, Vacation in Reno). For 1961's The Absent-Minded Professor, they were listed in promotional material as "the comedy team of Brown and Carney" as though it was designed as a comeback, but they shared no scenes.

After the team's split, Brown continued working in films and appeared on television shows such as I Married Joan, Wagon Train, and My Three Sons until his death in 1961.  Brown had also been teamed with Tim Ryan in the Columbia Pictures short film French Fried Frolic in 1949, and with Jack Kirkwood in four RKO Pictures short films in 1950 and 1951.  Carney also continued working in films, appearing in Walt Disney films and also had a cameo as a police sergeant in Stanley Kramer's 1963 film It's a Mad, Mad, Mad, Mad World.

Availability
Four of the eight movies the duo made together at RKO Radio Pictures as a team were released in a DVD collection entitled "The RKO Brown & Carney Comedy Collection" in January 2015 by Warner Archive. This two-disc set includes Adventures of a Rookie, Rookies in Burma, Girl Rush, and Genius at Work.  The film Step Lively was released on DVD by Warner Home Video in May 2008. Zombies on Broadway is available as part of the “Karloff & Lugosi Horror Classics” DVD set, released by Warner Home Video in October 2009.

Films
 Gangway for Tomorrow (RKO) (1943)
 Mexican Spitfire's Blessed Event (RKO) (1943)
 Around the World (RKO) (1943)
 Adventures of a Rookie (RKO) (1944) (first film as a team)
 Rookies in Burma (RKO) (1944) (sequel to Adventures of a Rookie)
 Seven Days Ashore (RKO) (1944)
 Step Lively (RKO) (1944) (with Frank Sinatra) (remake of Marx Brothers' film Room Service)
 Girl Rush (RKO) (1944) (with Robert Mitchum)
 Zombies on Broadway (RKO) (1945) (with Bela Lugosi)
 Radio Stars on Parade (RKO) (1945)
 Genius at Work (RKO) (1946) (last film as a team) (with Bela Lugosi) (remake of "The Super-Sleuth" and Wheeler and Woolsey's film The Nitwits)
 Vacation in Reno (1946) (no scenes together)
 Who Was That Lady? (Columbia) (1960)
 The Absent-Minded Professor (Walt Disney) (1961) (Brown as Coach Elkins, Carney as First Referee)

See also
Vaudeville
List of comedians

References

External links
 Brown and Carney: The Monkees of Obscure Comedy Teams

American comedy duos